The 1983 Louisville Cardinals football team represented the University of Louisville in the 1983 NCAA Division I-A football season. The Cardinals, led by fourth-year head coach Bob Weber, participated as independents and played their home games at Cardinal Stadium.

Schedule

Roster

References

Louisville
Louisville Cardinals football seasons
Louisville Cardinals football